The Town of Columbine Valley is a Statutory Town located in western Arapahoe County, Colorado, United States. The town population was 1,502 at the 2020 United States Census, a +19.59% increase since the 2010 United States Census. Columbine Valley is a part of the Denver-Aurora-Lakewood, CO Metropolitan Statistical Area and the Front Range Urban Corridor.

Geography
Columbine Valley is located at  (39.599665, -105.03736).

At the 2020 United States Census, the town had a total area of  including  of water.

Demographics

As of the census of 2010, there were 1,256 people, 491 households, and 421 families residing in the town.  There were 530 housing units.  The racial makeup of the town was 95.3% White, 0.7% African American, 0.4% Native American, 1.5% Asian, 0% Pacific Islander, and 1.5% from two or more races. Hispanic or Latino of any race were 2.1% of the population.

There were 491 households, out of which 26.5% had children under the age of 18 living with them, 80.9% were married couples living together, 3.1% had a female householder with no husband present, and 14.3% were non-families. 13.4% of all households were made up of individuals, and 37.7% had an individual 65 years of age or older.  The average household size was 2.56 and the average family size was 2.79.

In the town, the population was spread out, with 21.1% under the age of 18, 3.4% from 20 to 29, 5.3% from 30 to 39, 11.1% from 40 to 49, 34.6% from 50 to 64, and 22.3% who were 65 years of age or older.  The median age was 52.5 years. 49.7% of the population was male and 50.3% was female.

The median income for a household in the town was $130,417, and the median income for a family was $149,375. The per capita income for the town was $71,089. None of the families and 0.5% of the population were living below the poverty line, including no under eighteen and 0.6% of those 65 and older.

See also

Colorado
Bibliography of Colorado
Index of Colorado-related articles
Outline of Colorado
List of counties in Colorado
List of municipalities in Colorado
List of places in Colorado
List of statistical areas in Colorado
Front Range Urban Corridor
North Central Colorado Urban Area
Denver-Aurora, CO Combined Statistical Area
Denver-Aurora-Lakewood, CO Metropolitan Statistical Area

References

External links

Town of Columbine Valley website
CDOT map of the Town of Columbine Valley

Towns in Arapahoe County, Colorado
Towns in Colorado
Denver metropolitan area